Pankaj Udhas (born 17 May 1951) is an Indian ghazal and playback singer. He started his career with a release of a ghazal album titled Aahat in 1980 and subsequently recorded many hits like Mukarar in 1981, Tarrannum in 1982, Mehfil in 1983, Pankaj Udhas Live at Royal Albert Hall in 1984, Nayaab in 1985 and Aafreen in 1986. After his success as a ghazal singer, he was invited to appear and sing for a film by Mahesh Bhatt, Naam. Udhas rose to further fame for singing in the 1986 film Naam, in which his song "Chitthi Aayee Hai" (the letter has arrived) became an instant hit. He did playback singing for many Hindi films after that. Albums and live concerts around the globe brought him fame as a singer. In 2006, Pankaj Udhas was awarded Padma Shri, India's fourth highest civilian award.

His brothers Nirmal Udhas and Manhar Udhas are also singers.

Early life
Pankaj Udhas was born in Jetpur in Gujarat. He is the youngest of the three brothers. His parents are Keshubhai Udhas and Jituben Udhas. His eldest brother Manhar Udhas achieved some success as a Hindi playback singer in Bollywood films. His second elder brother Nirmal Udhas is also a well-known Ghazal Singer and was the first of the three brothers to start singing in the family. He had studied in Sir BPTI Bhavanagar. His family moved to Mumbai and Pankaj attended St. Xavier's College in Mumbai.

Udhas' family hails from a town named Charkhadi near Rajkot and were zamindars. His grandfather was the first graduate from the village and went on to become the Diwan (revenue minister) of the Bhavnagar State. His father, Keshubhai Udhas, was a government servant and had met the renowned veena player, Abdul Karim Khan, who taught him to play the dilruba. When Udhas was a child, his father would play the dilruba, a stringed instrument. Seeing his and his brothers' interest in music, his father enrolled them at the Sangeet Academy in Rajkot. Udhas initially enrolled himself to learn the tabla but later began learning Hindustani vocal classical music from Ghulam Qadir Khan Sahab. Udhas then moved to Mumbai to train under the tutelage of Navrang Nagpurkar, a singer from the Gwalior Gharana.

Career
A song titled Chandi Jaisa Rang hai tera, sone jaise bal (i.e. Your colour is like silver, your hair is like gold) was sung by Pankaj Udhas. Pankaj Udhas' older brother, Manhar Udhas was a stage performer that aided Pankaj in his introduction to musical performance. His first stage performance was during the Sino-Indian War, when he sang "Aye Mere Watan Ke Logo" and was given Rs. 51 by an audience member as a reward.

Four years later he joined the Sangeet Natya Academy in Rajkot and learned the nuances of playing the tabla. After that, he pursued a Bachelor of Science degree at Wilson College and St Xavier's college, Mumbai and started training in Indian classical vocal music under the tutelage of Master Navrang. Udhas's first song was in the film "Kamna" a solo composed by Usha Khanna and written by Naqsh Lyallpuri, the film was a flop but his rendition was very much appreciated. Subsequently, Udhas developed an interest in ghazals and learned Urdu to try to pursue a career as a ghazal singer. He spent ten months in Canada and the US doing ghazal concerts and returned to India with renewed vigour and confidence. His first ghazal album, Aahat, was released in 1980. From this, he began to have success and, as of 2011 he has released more than fifty albums and hundreds of compilation albums. In 1986, Udhas received another opportunity to perform in film, in the film Naam, which brought him fame. In 1990, he sang the melodious duet "Mahiya Teri Kasam" with Lata Mangeshkar, for the movie Ghayal. This song achieved immense popularity.  In 1994, Udhas sang the notable song, "Na Kajre Ki Dhar", from the film Mohra along with Sadhana Sargam which also became very popular. He continued working as a playback singer, making some on-screen appearances in films such as Saajan, Yeh Dillagi, Naam and Phir Teri Kahaani Yaad Aayee. His album Shagufta launched by Music India in December 1987 was the first to be released on compact disc in India. Later, Udhas started a talent hunt television program called Aadab Aarz Hai on Sony Entertainment Television.
Actor John Abraham calls Udhas his mentor.

Udhas' ghazals talk about love, intoxication and sharab.

Awards

 2006 – Pankaj Udhas Awarded Padmashree for his contribution to the art of ghazal singing his huge contribution to cancer patients and thallasemic children through his on the occasion of him completing 25 years of ghazal singing.
 2006 – Awarded the prestigious "Kalakar" award at Kolkata for "Hasrat" as "Best Ghazal album of 2005".
 2004 – Special Felicitation at the Wembley Conference Center, London for Completing 20 Years of Performance at the Prestigious Venue.
 2003 – MTV Immies Award for the successful album 'In Search of Meer'.
 2003 – Special Achievement Award at the Bollywood Music Award, New York for Popularizing Ghazals Across the Globe.
 2003 – Dadabhai Naoroji Millennium Award conferred by the Dadabhai Naoroji International Society for Contribution to Ghazal and the Music Industry.
 2002 – Award for Excellence in Music Field presented by Sahyog Foundation at Mumbai.
 2002 – Honored by the Indo-American Chamber of Commerce.
 2001 – Vocational Recognition Award for Outstanding Performance as a Ghazal singer presented by Rotary Club of Mumbai Downtown.
 1999 – Bharatiya Vidya Bhavan, USA Award for extraordinary services to Indian music, especially promotion of ghazals in India and abroad. Presented at the Festival of Ghazals held in New York.
 1998 – Indian Arts Awards Gala presented by the Mayor of the City of Jersey City.
 1998 – Outstanding Artistic Achievement Award presented by the American Academy of Artists at Atlantic City.
 1996 – Indira Gandhi Priyadarshani Award for Outstanding Services, Achievement and Contribution to Music.
 1994 – Honorary Citizenship of Lubbock Texas, USA.
 1994 – Radio Lotus Award for Outstanding Achievement and for the many songs featuring on the official hit parade of the radio. Presented by Radio Lotus, South Africa at the University of Durban.
 1993 – Giants International Award for extraordinary efforts to achieve the highest standards in the field of music thereby motivating the entire community to pursue excellence.
 1990 – Outstanding Young Persons' Award (1989–90) for positive leadership and distinguish services rendered to the nation. Presented by the Indian Junior Chambers.
 1985 – K L Saigal Award for being the Best Ghazal Singer of the Year.

Albums
Aahat (1980)
Nasha (1997)
Mukarrar (1981)
Tarrannum (1982)
Mehfil (1983)
Shamakhana
Pankaj Udhas Live at Albert Hall (1984)
Nayaab (1985)
Legend
Khazana
Aafreen (1986)
Shagufta
Nabeel
Aashiyana (1992)
Ek Dhun Pyar Ki (1992)
Rubayee
Teen Mausam
Geetnuma
Kaif
Khayaal
Aman
Woh Ladki Yaad Aati Hai
Stolen Moments
Mahek (1999)
Ghoonghat
Muskan
Dhadkan
Best of Pankaj Udhas Vol-1,2
Pankaj Udas 'Life Story' Vol-1,2
Pankaj Udhas Vol-1,2,3,4
Lamha
Janeman
 Jashn (2006)
 Endless Love
 Shaayar
 Rajuat (Gujarati)
 Baisakhi (Punjabi)
 Yaad
 Kabhi Ansoo Kabhi Khushboo Kabhi Naghuma
 Humnasheen
 In Search of Meer (2003)
 Hasrat (2005)
 Bhalobasha (Bengali)
 Yaara – Music by Ustad Amjad Ali Khan
 Shabad – Music by Vaibhav Saxena and Gunjan Jha
 Shaayar (2010)
 Barbad Mohabbat
 Nasheela
Sentimental (2013)
Khamoshi Ki Aawaz (2014)
Khwabon Ki Khahani (2015)
Madhose
Nayaab lamhe with Gulzar (2018)

Tracks

References

External links

 
 
 

1951 births
Living people
20th-century Indian male classical singers
Recipients of the Padma Shri in arts
Indian male ghazal singers
People from Rajkot
Gujarati people
People from Gujarat
21st-century Indian male classical singers